Haazinu, Ha'azinu, or Ha'Azinu ( — Hebrew for "listen" when directed to more than one person, the first word in the parashah) is the 53rd weekly Torah portion (parashah) in the annual Jewish cycle of Torah reading and the 10th in the Book of Deuteronomy. It constitutes . The parashah sets out the Song of Moses — an indictment of the Israelites' sins, a prophecy of their punishment, and a promise of God's ultimate redemption of them.

The parashah is made up of 2,326 Hebrew letters, 614 Hebrew words, 52 verses, and 92 lines in a Torah Scroll (Sefer Torah). Jews read it on a Sabbath between the holy days of Rosh Hashanah and Sukkot, generally in September or October.

Readings
In the Masoretic Text of the Tanakh (Hebrew Bible), Parashah Haazinu has two "open portion" (petuchah) divisions (roughly equivalent to paragraphs, often abbreviated with the Hebrew letter  (peh)). The first open portion (petuchah) spans nearly the entire parashah, except for the concluding maftir reading. The second open portion (petuchah) is coincident with the maftir reading. Parashah Haazinu has no "closed portion" (setumah) subdivisions (abbreviated with the Hebrew letter  (samekh)).

First reading — Deuteronomy 32:1–6
In the first reading (aliyah), Moses called on heaven and earth to hear his words, and asked that his speech be like rain and dew for the grass. Moses proclaimed that God was perfect in deed, just, faithful, true, and upright. God's children were unworthy, a crooked generation that played God false, ill requiting the Creator. The first reading (aliyah) ends here.

Second reading — Deuteronomy 32:7–12
In the second reading (aliyah), Moses exhorted the Israelites to remember that in ages past, God assigned the nations their homes and their due, but chose the Israelites as God's own people. God found the Israelites in the desert, watched over them, guarded them, like an eagle who rouses his nestlings, gliding down to his young, God spread God's wings and took Israel, bearing Israel along on God's pinions, God alone guided Israel. The second reading (aliyah) ends here.

Third reading — Deuteronomy 32:13–18
In the third reading (aliyah), God set the Israelites atop the highlands to feast on the yield of the earth and fed them honey, oil, curds, milk, lamb, wheat, and wine. So Israel grew fat and kicked and forsook God, incensed God with alien things, and sacrificed to demons and no-gods. The third reading (aliyah) ends here.

Fourth reading — Deuteronomy 32:19–28
In the fourth reading (aliyah), God saw, was vexed, and hid God's countenance from them, to see how they would fare. For they were a treacherous breed, children with no loyalty, who incensed God with no-gods, vexed God with their idols; thus God would incense them with a no-folk and vex them with a nation of fools. A fire flared in God's wrath and burned down to the base of the hills. God would sweep misfortunes on them, use God's arrows on them — famine, plague, pestilence, and fanged beasts — and with the sword would deal death and terror to young and old alike. God might have reduced them to nothing, made their memory cease among men, except for fear of the taunts of their enemies, who might misjudge and conclude that their own hand had prevailed and not God's. For Israel's enemies were a folk void of sense, lacking in discernment. The fourth reading (aliyah) ends here.

Fifth reading — Deuteronomy 32:29–39
In the fifth reading (aliyah), God wished that they were wise, then they would think about this, and gain insight into their future, for they would recognize that one could not have routed a thousand unless God had given them over. They were like Sodom and Gomorrah and their wine was the venom of asps. God stored it away to be the basis for God's vengeance and recompense when they should trip, for their day of disaster was near. God would vindicate God's people and take revenge for God's servants, when their might was gone. God would ask where the enemies' gods were — they who ate the fat of their offerings and drank their libation wine — let them rise up to help! There was no god beside God, who dealt death and gave life, wounded and healed. The fifth reading (aliyah) ends here.

Sixth reading — Deuteronomy 32:40–43
In the sixth reading (aliyah), God swore that when God would whet God's flashing blade, and lay hand on judgment, God would wreak vengeance on God's foes. God would make God's arrows drunk with blood, as God's sword devoured flesh, blood of the slain and the captive from the long-haired enemy chiefs. God would avenge the blood of God's servants, wreak vengeance on God's foes, and cleanse the land of God's people. The sixth reading (aliyah) ends here.

Seventh reading — Deuteronomy 32:44–52
In the seventh reading (aliyah), Moses came, together with Joshua, and recited all this poem to the people. And when Moses finished reciting, he told them to take his warnings to heart and enjoin them upon their children, for it was not a trifling thing but their very life at stake. The first open portion (petuchah) ends here.

In the maftir reading of  that concludes the parashah, God told Moses to ascend Mount Nebo and view the land of Canaan, for he was to die on the mountain, as his brother Aaron had died on Mount Hor, for they both broke faith with God when they struck the rock to produce water in the wilderness of Zin, failing to uphold God's sanctity among the Israelite people. The seventh reading (aliyah), the second open portion (petuchah), and the parashah end here.

Readings according to the triennial cycle
Jews who read the Torah according to the triennial cycle of Torah reading nonetheless read the entire parashah of Haazinu every year according to the schedule of readings above.

In inner-Biblical interpretation
The parashah has parallels or is discussed in these Biblical sources:

Similarly, Psalm  reports that God "summoned the heavens above, and the earth, for the trial of His people," saying "Bring in My devotees, who made a covenant with Me over sacrifice!"  continues: "Then the heavens proclaimed His righteousness, for He is a God who judges."

In , 15, 18, 30, and 31, Moses called God a "Rock."

 told how God "set him atop the highlands (al-bamatei)."

In classical rabbinic interpretation
The parashah is discussed in these rabbinic sources from the era of the Mishnah and the Talmud:

(See the image at the top of this article.) If a scribe writes the song as plain text, then the scroll is invalid.

Rabbi Samuel compared Moses to a general who held office in two provinces and was about to hold a feast. He needed to invite people from both provinces, so that neither would feel offended for having been overlooked. Moses was born on earth, but became great in heaven.

Rabbi Jeremiah ben Eleazar taught that God made such a stipulation with everything that was created in the six days of creation, as  says, "I, even My hands, have stretched out the heavens, and all their host have I commanded."

Similarly, a Midrash taught that God said that if you incline your ear to the Torah, then when you begin speaking the Words of the Torah, all will remain silent before you and listen. The Midrash taught that we learn this from Moses, for because he inclined his ear to the Torah, when he came to begin speaking the words of the Torah, both the heavenly and the earthly beings remained silent and listened.

Israel would say to God that her bad name endured, but God would say that God would remove her bad name as well, as  reports that Israel "shall be called by a new name." Israel would ask God whether God had not prohibited her reconciliation with God when  says, "If a man put away his wife, and she go from him, and become another man's, shall he return to her again?" (And thus God would forgive Israel and restore her original relationship with God.)

In , "My doctrine (likḥi) shall drop as the rain," Rav Judah read "doctrine" (lekaḥ) to mean Torah, as  states, "For I give you good doctrine (lekaḥ); do not forsake My Torah." Rav Judah thus concluded that a day with rain is as great as the day on which God gave the Torah. Rava argued that rainfall is even greater than the day on which God gave the Torah, as  says, "My doctrine shall drop as the rain," and when one makes a comparison, one compares a lesser thing to a greater thing. Thus, Rava argued, if  compares Torah to rain, rain must be greater than Torah.

Rabbi Berekhiah read , "My doctrine shall drop (ya'arof) as the rain," to teach that if we bow our necks (oref) in repentance, then the rain (for which we pray when it is absent) will fall immediately.

Rav Judah also read  to compare Torah to the four winds. Rav Judah read "My doctrine shall drop (ya'arof) as the rain" to refer to the west wind, which comes from the back of (me'orpo) the world, as the west was also referred to as the back. Rav Judah read "My speech shall distill (tizzal) as the dew" to refer to the north wind, which brings dry air that reduces the rain and grain and thereby devalues (mazzelet) gold (for when grain becomes scarce, its price rises, and the relative value of gold declines). Rav Judah read "As the small rain (kisirim) upon the tender growth" to refer to the east wind that rages through (maseret) the entire world like a demon (sa'ir) when it blows strongly. And Rav Judah read "And as the showers upon the herb" to refer to the south wind, which raises showers and causes herbs to grow.

The Sifre read , "like showers on young growths," to teach that just as showers fall on grass and make it grow and develop, so words of Torah make people grow and develop. 

Rabbi Abbahu cited  to support the proposition of Mishnah Berakhot 7:1 that three who have eaten together publicly should say the Grace after Meals (Birkat Hamazon) together as well. In , Moses says, "When I (who am one) proclaim the name of the Lord, you (in the plural, who are thus at least two more) ascribe greatness to our God." Thus by using the plural to for "you," Moses implies that at least three are present, and they should ascribe greatness to God.

Rabbi Jose also found support in those words for the proposition that Grace after Meals is said only when three are present; that one must say "Amen" after the one who says the blessing; that one must say, "Blessed is the Name of the Glory of His Kingdom forever and ever"; and that when people say, "May His great name be blessed," one must answer, "Forever and ever and ever." Similarly, the Talmud reports that a Baraita taught that Rabbi Judah the Prince read , "When I proclaim the name of the Lord, ascribe greatness to our God," to teach that Moses told the Jewish people: "When I mention the name of God, you give God glory and recite praises in God’s honor."

The Gemara tells that when Rabbi Ḥanina ben Teradion, his wife, and his daughter left a Roman tribunal that sentenced him and his wife to death for studying the Torah, they declared their submission to God's judgment by quoting . Rabbi Ḥanina ben Teradion quoted  to say, "The Rock, His work is perfect; for all his ways are justice." His wife continued quoting  to say, "A God of faithfulness and without iniquity, just and right is He." And his daughter quoted  "Great in counsel and mighty in work, whose eyes are open upon all the ways of the sons of men, to give everyone according to his ways, and according to the fruit of his doing." Judah the Prince remarked on how great these righteous ones were, for three Scriptural passages expressing submission to Divine justice readily occurred to them just in time for their declaration of faith.

A Midrash read  to help understand the non-Jewish prophet Balaam. The Midrash explained that the Torah records Balaam's story to make known that because the nonbeliever prophet Balaam did what he did, God removed prophecy and the Holy Spirit from nonbelievers. The Midrash taught that God originally wished to deprive nonbelievers of the opportunity to argue that God had estranged them. Just as God raised up Moses for Israel, God raised up Balaam for the nonbelievers. Thus God removed prophecy from nonbelievers.

Rabbi Ḥanina bar Papa taught that to enjoy this world without reciting a blessing is tantamount to robbing God, as  says, "Whoever robs his father or his mother and says, 'It is no transgression,' is the companion of a destroyer," and  says of God, "Is not He your father Who has gotten you?"

My father!'"

Rabbi Simeon ben Yoḥai taught that , "When the Most High gave to the nations their inheritance," describes events that took place when God confused the languages of humankind at the Tower of Babel. Rabbi Simeon told that God called to the 70 angels who surround the throne of God's glory and said, "Let us descend and let us confuse the 70 nations (that made up the world) and the 70 languages." Rabbi Simeon taught that  reports that they cast lots among them. God's lot fell upon Abraham and his descendants, as  reports, "For the Lord's portion is his people; Jacob is the lot of his inheritance." God said that God's soul lives by the portion and lot that fell to God, as  says, "The lots have fallen to me in pleasures; yea, I have a goodly heritage." God then descended with the 70 angels who surround the throne of God's glory and they confused the speech of humankind into 70 nations and 70 languages.

Rabbi Judah ben Simon compared Israel to a king's son who went into the marketplace and struck people but was not struck in return (because of his being the king's son). He insulted but was not insulted. He went up to his father arrogantly. But the father asked the son whether he thought that he was respected on his own account, when the son was respected only on account of the respect that was due to the father. So the father renounced the son, and as a result, no one took any notice of him. So when Israel went out of Egypt, the fear of them fell upon all the nations, as  reported, "The peoples have heard, they tremble; pangs have taken hold on the inhabitants of Philistia. Then were the chiefs of Edom frightened; the mighty men of Moab, trembling takes hold upon them; all the inhabitants of Canaan are melted away. Terror and dread falls upon them." But when Israel transgressed and sinned, God asked Israel whether it thought that it was respected on its own account, when it was respected only on account of the respect that was due to God. So God turned away from them a little, and the Amalekites came and attacked Israel, as  reports, "Then Amalek came, and fought with Israel in Rephidim," and then the Canaanites came and fought with Israel, as  reports, "And the Canaanite, the king of Arad, who dwelt in the South, heard tell that Israel came by the way of Atharim; and he fought against Israel." God told the Israelites that they had no genuine faith, as  says, "they are a very disobedient generation, children in whom is no faith." God concluded that the Israelites were rebellious, but to destroy them was impossible, to take them back to Egypt was impossible, and God could not change them for another people. So God concluded to chastise and try them with suffering.

Rav Bardela bar Tabyumi taught in Rav's name that to whomever "hiding of the face" does not apply is not one of the Children of Israel, and to whomever "they shall be devoured" does not apply is also not one of them. The Rabbis confronted Rava, saying "hiding of the face" and "they shall be devoured" did not apply to Rava. Rava asked the Rabbis whether they knew how much he was forced to send secretly to the Court of King Shapur of Persia. Even so, the Rabbis directed their eyes upon Rava in suspicion. Meanwhile, the Court of King Shapur sent men who seized Rava's property. Rava then said that this bore out what Rabban Simeon ben Gamliel taught, that wherever the Rabbis direct their eyes in suspicion, either death or poverty follows. Interpreting "I will hide My face," Rava taught that God said although God would hide God's face from them, God would nonetheless speak to them in a dream. Rav Joseph taught that God's hand is nonetheless stretched over us to protect us, as  says, "And I have covered you in the shadow of My hand." Rabbi Joshua ben Hanania was once at the Roman emperor Hadrian's court, when an unbeliever gestured to Rabbi Joshua in sign language that the Jewish people was a people from whom their God had turned His face. Rabbi Joshua ben Hanania gestured in reply that God's hand was stretched over the Jewish people. Emperor Hadrian asked Rabbi Joshua what unbeliever had said. Rabbi Joshua told the emperor what unbeliever had said and what Rabbi Joshua had replied. They then asked the unbeliever what he had said, and he told them. And then they asked what Rabbi Joshua had replied, and the unbeliever did not know. They decreed that a man who does not understand what he is being shown by gesture should hold converse in signs before the emperor, and they led him forth and executed him for his disrespect to the emperor.

A Midrash taught that , "For they are a very contrary (tahpukot) generation," applied to the spies. The Midrash asked whether the spies were men or fools. If  thus implies that the spies were righteous people, could they still have been fools? The Midrash explained that they were fools because they spread an evil report about the land, and  says, "He that utters a slander is a fool." The Midrash reconciled the two characterizations by telling that the spies were great men who then made fools of themselves. Yet Moses did not want to send them on his own responsibility, so he consulted God about each individual, mentioning the name and tribe of each, and God told Moses that each was worthy. The Midrash explained that one can infer that God told Moses that they were worthy, because  reports, "And Moses sent them from the wilderness of Paran according to the commandment of the Lord." Afterwards, at the end of 40 days, they changed and made all the trouble, causing that generation to be punished; thus  says, "For they are a very contrary (tahpukot) generation," since when they were selected they were righteous and then they changed (nitapeku). Accordingly,  says, "Send you men," and afterwards  says, "These are the names of the men."

Reading , "children in whom is no faithfulness," Rabbi Meir noted that even when people are faithless, God still considers them God’s children.

Rabbi Shimon ben Lakish reasoned from  that Torah study keeps away painful sufferings. He argued that the word , uf, refers only to the Torah, as  says, "Will you close (hataif) your eyes to it (the Torah)? It is gone." And , reshef, refers only to painful sufferings, as  says, "The wasting of hunger, and the devouring of the fiery bolt (reshef). Rabbi Joḥanan said to Rabbi Shimon ben Lakish that even school children know that the Torah protects against painful disease. For  says, "And He said: 'If you will diligently hearken to the voice of the Lord your God, and will do that which is right in His eyes, and will give ear to His commandments, and keep all His statutes, I will put none of the diseases upon you that I have put upon the Egyptians; for I am the Lord Who heals you." Rather one should say that God visits those who have the opportunity to study the Torah and do not do so with ugly and painful sufferings which stir them up. For  says, "I was dumb with silence, I kept silence from the good thing, and my pain was stirred up." "The good thing" refers only to the Torah, as  says, "For I give you good doctrine; forsake not My teaching."

Rav Hisda taught that one walking in a dirty alleyway should not recite the Shema, and one reciting the Shema who comes upon a dirty alleyway should stop reciting. Of one who would not stop reciting, Rav Adda bar Ahavah quoted  to say: "he has despised the word of the Lord." And of one who does stop reciting, Rabbi Abbahu taught that  says: "through this word you shall prolong your days."

Rabbi Joḥanan counted ten instances in which Scripture refers to the death of Moses (including one in the parashah), teaching that God did not finally seal the harsh decree until God declared it to Moses. Rabbi Joḥanan cited these ten references to the death of Moses: (1)  "But I must die in this land; I shall not cross the Jordan"; (2)  "The Lord said to Moses: 'Behold, your days approach that you must die'"; (3)  "[E]ven now, while I am still alive in your midst, you have been defiant toward the Lord; and how much more after my death"; (4)  "For I know that after my death, you will act wickedly and turn away from the path that I enjoined upon you"; (5)  "And die in the mount that you are about to ascend, and shall be gathered to your kin, as your brother Aaron died on Mount Hor and was gathered to his kin"; (6)  "This is the blessing with which Moses, the man of God, bade the Israelites farewell before his death"; (7)  "So Moses the servant of the Lord died there in the land of Moab, at the command of the Lord"; (8)  "Moses was 120 years old when he died"; (9)  "Now it came to pass after the death of Moses"; and (10)  "Moses My servant is dead." Rabbi Joḥanan taught that ten times it was decreed that Moses should not enter the Land of Israel, but the harsh decree was not finally sealed until God revealed it to him and declared (as reported in ): "It is My decree that you should not pass over."

The Sifre taught that God told Aaron to go in a cave, to climb onto a bier, to spread his hands, to spread his legs, to close his mouth, and to close his eyes, and then Aaron died. And at that moment, Moses concluded that one would be happy to die that way.

The Gemara implied that the sin of Moses in striking the rock at Meribah compared favorably to the sin of David. The Gemara reported that Moses and David were two good leaders of Israel. David, however, begged that his sin be blotted out, as  says, "Happy is he whose transgression is forgiven, whose sin is pardoned." The Gemara compared the cases of Moses and David to the cases of two women whom the court sentenced to be lashed. The woman who had eaten unripe figs begged the court to make known for what offense she was being flogged, lest people say that she was being punished for the same sin as the other woman. The court thus made known her sin, and the Torah repeatedly records the sin of Moses.

In medieval Jewish interpretation
The parashah is discussed in these medieval Jewish sources:

Furthermore, said Rashi, if Israel acted meritoriously, then the witnesses would be able to reward them, as the earth would yield its produce and the heavens would give its dew. (.) And if Israel acted sinfully, then the hand of the witnesses would be the first to inflict punishment (carrying out the injunction of ), as God would close off heaven's rain, and the soil would not yield its produce.

Rashi interpreted  to refer to Torah, which, like rain, provides life to the world. Rashi interpreted that Moses wanted to teach the children of Israel slowly, the knowledge "raining" down on the people in small portions, for if they were to be subject to all knowledge coming down at once, they would be overwhelmed and thus wiped out.

But Baḥya cautioned that one must be careful not to take descriptions of God's attributes literally or in a physical sense. Rather, one must know that they are metaphors, geared to what we are capable of grasping with our powers of understanding, because of our urgent need to know God. But God is infinitely greater and loftier than all of these attributes.

For each specific case has its own particular reason, known only to God.

Baḥya ibn Paquda read  to teach that even though students must first learn Tradition, they should not rely solely on Tradition if they are able to attain comprehension through reason. He therefore deduced that all who are capable are obligated to investigate with their intellect and to bring logical proofs of the Tradition by the demonstration that careful judgment would support.

He has made you and established you?" to teach that God alone guides a person from the beginning of a person's existence and development. Baḥya cited this trait, in turn, as one of seven key factors that make it possible for one to trust in another.

Maimonides taught that Scripture employs the idea of God's hiding God's face (as in ) to designate the manifestation of a certain work of God. Thus, Moses the prophet foretold misfortune by saying (in God's words in ), "And I will hide My face from them, and they shall be devoured." For, Maimonides interpreted, when people are deprived of Divine protection, they are exposed to all dangers, and become the victim of circumstance, their fortune dependent on chance — a terrible threat. Further, Maimonides taught that the hiding of God's face results from human choice. When people do not meditate on God, they are separated from God, and they are then exposed to any evil that might befall them. For, Maimonides taught, the intellectual link with God secures the presence of Providence and protection from evil accidents. Maimonides argued that this principle applies equally to an individual person and a whole community.

In modern interpretation
The parashah is discussed in these modern sources:

Professor Daniel I. Block of Wheaton College, however, argued that the legal features of the song are "quite muted, taking second place to liturgical features." Block imagined the song as an anthem, recited antiphonally as follows in liturgy associated with the annual reading of the Torah at Sukkot.

Professor Harold Fisch, of Bar-Ilan University, described the witness function of the song as "a kind of time bomb; it awaits its hour and then springs forward into harsh remembrance."

A Midrash interpreted the report of  that God "fixed the boundaries of peoples in relation to Israel's number" (l'mispar b'nei Yisrael) to teach that before the days of Abraham, God dealt harshly with the world: The sins of Noah's generation resulted in the flood; the generation that built the Tower of Babel was dispersed throughout the globe, prompting the proliferation of languages; the sins of Sodom and Gomorrah were answered with fire and brimstone. According to the Midrash, when Abraham came into the world, God ceased the cataclysmic punishments and set the punishments of other peoples in relationship to Israel's presence in the world. This Midrash conveys that the Israelites' presence somehow lessened God's anger, bringing greater stability to the world. The Midrash teaches that Jews, then, have a unique ability and responsibility to bring peace and stability to the world.

Israeli scholar Nahama Leibowitz noted that  contains a "very daring anthropomorphism indeed, attributing to God the sentiment of fear."

In critical analysis
Some scholars who follow the Documentary Hypothesis find evidence of three separate sources in the parashah. Some scholars attribute the bulk of the parashah,  to an insertion by the second Deuteronomistic historian (sometimes abbreviated Dtr 2) who wrote in the Babylonian captivity after 587 BCE. And then these scholars attribute the conclusion of the parashah,  to a later Redactor (sometimes abbreviated R) who folded the Deuteronomic report into the context established at the end of the book of Numbers. For a color-coded display of verses according to this hypothesis, see the display of Deuteronomy according to the Documentary Hypothesis at Wikiversity.

In the Masoretic Text and the Samaritan Pentateuch,  reports how God set the borders of the peoples according to the number of "the children of Israel." In a Qumran scroll (4QDeutj) and the Septuagint, however, it is the number of "the children of God," whom Martin Abegg Jr., Peter Flint, and Eugene Ulrich suggested may mean the divine beings who would serve as protectors for the various nations. Professor Robert Alter argued that this phrase appears to reflect a very early stage in the evolution of biblical monotheism. Alter suggested that it caused later transmitters of the text theological discomfort and probably provoked these transmitters deliberately to change it in the interests of piety. In Alter's interpretation of the older world-picture, a celestial entourage of subordinate divine beings or lesser deities surrounded the supreme God. In Alter's reading, the original  assumed that God, in allotting portions of the earth to the various peoples, also allowed each people its own lesser deity.

Similarly, in the Masoretic Text and the Samaritan Pentateuch,  says, "Sing aloud, O you nations, of His people; for He avenges the blood of His servants, and renders vengeance to His adversaries, and makes expiation for the land of His people." But in another Qumran scroll (4QDeutq, supported by the Septuagint),  says, "Rejoice, O heavens, together with Him; and bow down to Him all you gods, for He will avenge the blood of His sons, and will render vengeance to His enemies, and will recompense those who hate Him, and will atone for the land of His people." Jeffrey Tigay suggested that scribes responsible for transmitting the text may have been concerned that readers not envision supernatural beings with power that would encourage the readers to worship these beings along with God.

In Samaritan interpretation

As Samaritans accept only the Torah as prophetic and reject the rest of the Tanakh, they base their belief in the resurrection of the dead (ḥayyei ha-metim) entirely on Parashah Haazinu.

Samaritans consider themselves and Jews collectively to be the people of Israel, so they believe that Jews will experience resurrection of the dead just as Samaritans will. Samaritans see this as motivation for non-Samaritans and non-Jews (gentiles) to convert and join the people of Israel if they want to have a place in the World To Come.

Commandments
Maimonides cites the parashah for one negative commandment:
Not to drink wine of libation to idolatry

According to Sefer ha-Chinuch, however, there are no commandments in the parashah.

And according to others, the parashah contains a commandment to listen, hear, and learn one's ancestral history, as  instructs one to "ask your father and he will tell you."

In the liturgy
At the formal beginning of the K'riat Sh'ma prayer service, the leader recites the Barchu, "Praise Adonai, the Exalted One."

In , 15, 18, 30, and 31, Moses referred to God as "Rock" (Tzur).

Haftarah

Generally
The haftarah for the parashah is the song of David, 2 Samuel  (which is nearly identical to ). Both the parashah and the haftarah set out the song of a great leader. Both the parashah (in ) and the haftarah (in ) teach that Providence repays human actions in kind.

On Shabbat Shuva

Notes

Further reading
The parashah has parallels or is discussed in these sources:

Biblical
; .
; ; ; .
; ; .
.
; ;  (God as "the Rock").

Early nonrabbinic
Dead Sea scrolls 4QDeutj, 4QDeutq
Josephus, Antiquities of the Jews 4:8:44, 47 . Circa 93–94, in, e.g., The Works of Josephus: Complete and Unabridged, New Updated Edition. Translated by William Whiston, pages 123–25. Peabody, Massachusetts: Hendrickson Publishers, 1987.

Classical rabbinic
Tosefta: Shabbat 8:24-25; Chagigah 2:6; Sotah 4:8. Land of Israel, circa 250 CE. In, e.g., The Tosefta: Translated from the Hebrew, with a New Introduction. Translated by Jacob Neusner, volume 1, pages 385, 669, 848. Peabody, Massachusetts: Hendrickson Publishers, 2002.
Sifre to Deuteronomy 306:1–341:1. Land of Israel, circa 250–350 C.E. In, e.g., Sifre to Deuteronomy: An Analytical Translation. Translated by Jacob Neusner, volume 2, pages 295–397. Atlanta: Scholars Press, 1987.
Jerusalem Talmud: Berakhot 72b, 84b; Peah 5a, 7b, 48b; Kilayim 82a; Sheviit 5b; Maaser Sheni 49b; Shabbat 13b; Eruvin 33a; Rosh Hashanah 22a; Taanit 9b, 28a; Megillah 13b, 34b; Chagigah 10a; Ketubot 30a, 53a, 71b; Sotah 9a; Kiddushin 21b; Sanhedrin 9b, 36b, 64b, 68b; Shevuot 13a; Avodah Zarah 2b. Tiberias, Land of Israel, circa 400 CE. In, e.g., Talmud Yerushalmi. Edited by Chaim Malinowitz, Yisroel Simcha Schorr, and Mordechai Marcus, volumes 2–3, 5–6a, 10, 13, 17, 24, 25–27, 31–32, 36, 40, 44–47. Brooklyn: Mesorah Publications, 2006–2020. And in, e.g., The Jerusalem Talmud: A Translation and Commentary. Edited by Jacob Neusner and translated by Jacob Neusner, Tzvee Zahavy, B. Barry Levy, and Edward Goldman. Peabody, Massachusetts: Hendrickson Publishers, 2009.
Genesis Rabbah 1:14; 5:5; 12:1; 13:14; 15:7; 17:3; 22:2; 44:21; 53:15; 65:15; 68:12; 96:5. Land of Israel, 5th Century. In, e.g., Midrash Rabbah: Genesis. Translated by Harry Freedman and Maurice Simon, volume 1, pages 13, 36, 88, 106, 108, 123, 181, 375, 474; volume 2, pages 590, 626, 890, 930. London: Soncino Press, 1939. .
Leviticus Rabbah 2:10; 4:1; 18:5; 22:8; 23:5, 12. Land of Israel, 5th Century. In, e.g., Midrash Rabbah: Leviticus. Translated by Harry Freedman and Maurice Simon, pages 30, 49, 175, 233, 287, 295, 303. London: Soncino Press, 1939. .

Babylonian Talmud: Berakhot 5a–b, 21a, 24b, 35b, 45a, 56b; Shabbat 103b; Pesachim 111b; Yoma 37a, 86b; Taanit 7a, 11a; Chagigah 5a–b, 12b; Yevamot 63b; Ketubot 8b, 111b; Kiddushin 36a; Baba Kama 50a, 60b; Bava Batra 25a; 91b, 97a; Avodah Zarah 18a, 29b. Sasanian Empire, 6th Century. In, e.g., Talmud Bavli. Edited by Yisroel Simcha Schorr, Chaim Malinowitz, and Mordechai Marcus, 72 volumes. Brooklyn: Mesorah Pubs., 2006.
Esther Rabbah prologue 11; 1:6; 5:1; 7:13. 5th–11th centuries. In, e.g., Midrash Rabbah: Esther. Translated by Maurice Simon, volume 9, pages 24, 67, 98. London: Soncino Press, 1939. .
Ruth Rabbah: prologue 3, 4, 7. 6th–7th century. In, e.g., Midrash Rabbah: Ruth. Translated by L. Rabinowitz, volume 8, pages 6 ff. London: Soncino Press, 1939. .
Song of Songs Rabbah 1:11; 8:7. 6th–7th century. In, e.g., Midrash Rabbah: Song of Songs. Translated by Maurice Simon, volume 9, pages 19, 98, 308. London: Soncino Press, 1939. .
Ecclesiastes Rabbah 2:15; 3:13, 17, 19; 9:5. 6th–8th centuries. In, e.g., Midrash Rabbah: Esther. Translated by Maurice Simon, volume 8, pages 11, 62, 88, 97, 103–04, 230. London: Soncino Press, 1939. .

Medieval
Deuteronomy Rabbah 1:5; 3:5; 5:4; 8:2; 10:1–4; 11:5, 10. Land of Israel, 9th Century. In, e.g., Midrash Rabbah: Deuteronomy. Translated by Harry Freedman and Maurice Simon. London: Soncino Press, 1939. .
Exodus Rabbah 1:12; 3:8; 5:12, 14; 13:2; 15:12, 16; 21:3; 23:2, 8; 24:1; 29:7; 30:1, 11, 21; 32:7; 42:1; 51:7. 10th Century. In, e.g., Midrash Rabbah: Exodus. Translated by S. M. Lehrman. London: Soncino Press, 1939. .
Lamentations Rabbah: prologue 24, 25, 34; 1:33, 55; 2:4. 10th century. In, e.g., Midrash Rabbah: Deuteronomy/Lamentations. Translated by A. Cohen, volume 7, pages 37, 52, 64, 107, 145, 159, 161. London: Soncino Press, 1939. .
Rashi. Commentary. Deuteronomy 32. Troyes, France, late 11th Century. In, e.g., Rashi. The Torah: With Rashi's Commentary Translated, Annotated, and Elucidated. Translated and annotated by Yisrael Isser Zvi Herczeg, volume 5, pages 329–69. Brooklyn: Mesorah Publications, 1997. .

Rashbam. Commentary on the Torah. Troyes, early 12th century. In, e.g., Rashbam's Commentary on Deuteronomy: An Annotated Translation. Edited and translated by Martin I. Lockshin, pages 171–97. Providence, Rhode Island: Brown Judaic Studies, 2004. .
Judah Halevi. Kuzari. 2:16; 3:11; 4:3. Toledo, Spain, 1130–1140. In, e.g., Jehuda Halevi. Kuzari: An Argument for the Faith of Israel. Introduction by Henry Slonimsky, pages 92, 149, 201. New York: Schocken, 1964. .
Abraham ibn Ezra. Commentary on the Torah. Mid-12th century. In, e.g., Ibn Ezra's Commentary on the Pentateuch: Deuteronomy (Devarim). Translated and annotated by H. Norman Strickman and Arthur M. Silver, volume 5, pages 232–74. New York: Menorah Publishing Company, 2001. .
Numbers Rabbah 2:6; 8:4; 9:1, 7, 11, 14, 49; 10:2; 12:11; 13:14; 14:12; 16:5, 24; 17:5; 20:1, 19, 21. 12th Century. In, e.g., Midrash Rabbah: Numbers. Translated by Judah J. Slotki. London: Soncino Press, 1939. .
Letter from Abraham the parnas. Kiev, Middle Ages. In Mark R. Cohen. The Voice of the Poor in the Middle Ages: An Anthology of Documents from the Cairo Geniza, page 64. Princeton: Princeton University Press, 2005. .

Maimonides. Mishneh Torah: Hilchot Yesodei HaTorah (The Laws that Are the Foundations of the Torah), chapter 1, halachot 9, 12. Egypt, circa 1170–1180. In, e.g., Mishneh Torah: Hilchot Yesodei HaTorah: The Laws [which Are] the Foundations of the Torah. Translated by Eliyahu Touger, volume 1, pages 148–50, 156–57. New York: Moznaim Publishing, 1989. .
Maimonides. Mishneh Torah: Hilchot Avodat Kochavim V'Chukkoteihem (The Laws of the Worship of Stars and their Statutes), chapter 7, halachah 3. Egypt, circa 1170–1180. In, e.g., Mishneh Torah: Hilchot Avodat Kochavim V'Chukkoteihem: The Laws of the Worship of Stars and their Statutes.Translated by Eliyahu Touger, volume 3. New York: Moznaim Publishing, 1990.  .
Maimonides. The Guide for the Perplexed, part 1, chapters 16, 36, 48, 70; part 2, chapters 6, 28, 47; part 3, chapters 12, 24–26, 37–38, 46, 49, 53. Cairo, Egypt, 1190. In, e.g., Moses Maimonides. The Guide for the Perplexed. Translated by Michael Friedländer, pages 26, 51, 65, 105, 161, 204, 248, 268, 271, 304, 309–10, 334, 340, 363, 375, 393. New York: Dover Publications, 1956. .

Hezekiah ben Manoah. Hizkuni. France, circa 1240. In, e.g., Chizkiyahu ben Manoach. Chizkuni: Torah Commentary. Translated and annotated by Eliyahu Munk, volume 4, pages 1202–18. Jerusalem: Ktav Publishers, 2013. .
Naḥmanides. Commentary on the Torah. Jerusalem, circa 1270. In, e.g., Ramban (Nachmanides): Commentary on the Torah: Deuteronomy. Translated by Charles B. Chavel, volume 5, pages 352–69. New York: Shilo Publishing House, 1976. .

Zohar part 1, pages 6a, 22b, 26a, 53a, 87b, 96b, 138b, 139b, 143b, 160a, 161b, 163a, 164a, 177a, 189b, 192a; part 2, pages 5b, 26b, 64a, 64b, 80b, 83b, 86a, 95b, 96a, 108b, 125a, 144a, 155b, 157a, 162b, 210a; part 3, pages 60b, 78b, 126a, 210b, 263a, 268a, 286a–299b. Spain, late 13th Century. In, e.g., The Zohar. Translated by Harry Sperling and Maurice Simon. 5 volumes. London: Soncino Press, 1934.
Bahya ben Asher. Commentary on the Torah. Spain, early 14th century. In, e.g., Midrash Rabbeinu Bachya: Torah Commentary by Rabbi Bachya ben Asher. Translated and annotated by Eliyahu Munk, volume 7, pages 2773–813. Jerusalem: Lambda Publishers, 2003. .
Isaac ben Moses Arama. Akedat Yizhak (The Binding of Isaac). Late 15th century. In, e.g., Yitzchak Arama. Akeydat Yitzchak: Commentary of Rabbi Yitzchak Arama on the Torah. Translated and condensed by Eliyahu Munk, volume 2, pages 914–22. New York, Lambda Publishers, 2001. .

Modern
Isaac Abravanel. Commentary on the Torah. Italy, between 1492–1509. In, e.g., Abarbanel: Selected Commentaries on the Torah: Volume 5: Devarim/Deuteronomy. Translated and annotated by Israel Lazar, pages 200–33. Brooklyn: CreateSpace, 2015. .
Obadiah ben Jacob Sforno. Commentary on the Torah. Venice, 1567. In, e.g., Sforno: Commentary on the Torah. Translation and explanatory notes by Raphael Pelcovitz, pages 992–1011. Brooklyn: Mesorah Publications, 1997. .

Moshe Alshich. Commentary on the Torah. Safed, circa 1593. In, e.g., Moshe Alshich. Midrash of Rabbi Moshe Alshich on the Torah. Translated and annotated by Eliyahu Munk, volume 3, pages 1130–42. New York, Lambda Publishers, 2000. .
Saul Levi Morteira. "They Provoked My Jealousy with a Non-God." Budapest, 1641. In Marc Saperstein. Exile in Amsterdam: Saul Levi Morteira's Sermons to a Congregation of "New Jews," pages 489–526. Cincinnati: Hebrew Union College Press, 2005. .
Avraham Yehoshua Heschel. Commentaries on the Torah. Cracow, Poland, mid-17th century. Compiled as Chanukat HaTorah. Edited by Chanoch Henoch Erzohn. Piotrków, Poland, 1900. In Avraham Yehoshua Heschel. Chanukas HaTorah: Mystical Insights of Rav Avraham Yehoshua Heschel on Chumash. Translated by Avraham Peretz Friedman, pages 324–25. Southfield, Michigan: Targum Press/Feldheim Publishers, 2004. .
Chaim ibn Attar. Ohr ha-Chaim. Venice, 1742. In Chayim ben Attar. Or Hachayim: Commentary on the Torah. Translated by Eliyahu Munk, volume 5, pages 1991–2016. Brooklyn: Lambda Publishers, 1999. .

Samson Raphael Hirsch. Horeb: A Philosophy of Jewish Laws and Observances. Translated by Isidore Grunfeld, pages 444–45. London: Soncino Press, 1962. Reprinted 2002 . Originally published as Horeb, Versuche über Jissroel's Pflichten in der Zerstreuung. Germany, 1837.
Emily Dickinson. Poem 112 (Where bells no more affright the morn —). Circa 1859. Poem 168 (If the foolish, call them "flowers" —). Circa 1860. Poem 597 (It always felt to me — a wrong). Circa 1862. In The Complete Poems of Emily Dickinson. Edited by Thomas H. Johnson, pages 53, 79–80, 293–94. New York: Little, Brown & Co., 1960. .

Samuel David Luzzatto (Shadal). Commentary on the Torah. Padua, 1871. In, e.g., Samuel David Luzzatto. Torah Commentary. Translated and annotated by Eliyahu Munk, volume 4, pages 1271–83. New York: Lambda Publishers, 2012. .
Yehudah Aryeh Leib Alter. Sefat Emet. Góra Kalwaria (Ger), Poland, before 1906. Excerpted in The Language of Truth: The Torah Commentary of Sefat Emet. Translated and interpreted by Arthur Green, pages 333–37. Philadelphia: Jewish Publication Society, 1998. . Reprinted 2012. .

Hermann Cohen. Religion of Reason: Out of the Sources of Judaism. Translated with an introduction by Simon Kaplan; introductory essays by Leo Strauss, page 77. New York: Ungar, 1972. Reprinted Atlanta: Scholars Press, 1995. . Originally published as Religion der Vernunft aus den Quellen des Judentums. Leipzig: Gustav Fock, 1919.*Joseph Reider. The Holy Scriptures: Deuteronomy with Commentary, pages 298–321. Philadelphia: Jewish Publication Society, 1937.
Alexander Alan Steinbach. Sabbath Queen: Fifty-four Bible Talks to the Young Based on Each Portion of the Pentateuch, pages 168–71. New York: Behrman's Jewish Book House, 1936.
Patrick W. Skehan. "The Structure of the Song of Moses in Deuteronomy." Catholic Biblical Quarterly, volume 13 (number 2) (1951): pages 153–63.

Patrick W. Skehan. "A Fragment of the 'Song of Moses' (Deut. 32) from Qumran." Bulletin of the American Schools of Oriental Research, volume 136 (1954): pages 12–15. (4QDeut. 32).
William F. Albright. "Some Remarks on the Song of Moses in Dt 32." Vetus Testamentum, volume 9 (1959): pages 339–346. 
Herbert B. Huffmon. "The Covenant Lawsuit in the Prophets." Journal of Biblical Literature, volume 78 (1959): page 285.
G. Ernest Wright. "The Lawsuit of God: A Form-Critical Study of Deuteronomy 32." In Israel's Prophetic Heritage: Essays in Honor of James Muilenburg, pages 26–67. Edited by Bernhard W. Anderson and Walter Harrelson. London: SCM Press, 1962. 
James R. Boston. "The Wisdom Influence upon the Song of Moses." Journal of Biblical Literature, volume 87 (1968): pages 198–202.

Martin Buber. On the Bible: Eighteen studies, pages 80–92. New York: Schocken Books, 1968.
Nehama Leibowitz. Studies in Devarim: Deuteronomy, pages 327–69. Jerusalem: The World Zionist Organization, 1980.
J. Kenneth Kuntz. "Psalm 18: A Rhetorical-Critical Analysis." Journal for the Study of the Old Testament, volume 26 (1983): pages 3–31. ( is nearly identical to the haftarah).
Pinchas H. Peli. Torah Today: A Renewed Encounter with Scripture, pages 239–42. Washington, D.C.: B'nai B'rith Books, 1987. .
J.M. Wiebe, "The Form, Setting and Meaning of the Song of Moses," Studia Biblica et Theologica, volume 17 (1989): pages 119–63.
Elliot N. Dorff. "A Jewish Approach to End-Stage Medical Care." New York: Rabbinical Assembly, 1990. YD 339:1.1990b. In Responsa: 1980–1990: The Committee on Jewish Law and Standards of the Conservative Movement. Edited by David J. Fine, pages 519, 531–32, 564. New York: Rabbinical Assembly, 2005. . (implications of God's ownership of the universe on the duty to maintain life and health).
Harold Fisch. "The Song of Moses: Pastoral in Reverse." In Poetry with a Purpose: Biblical Poetics and Interpretation, pages 55–79. Bloomington, Indiana: Indiana University Press, 1990. .
Patrick D. Miller. Deuteronomy, pages 226–35. Louisville, Kentucky: John Knox Press, 1990.
Mark S. Smith. The Early History of God: Yahweh and the Other Deities in Ancient Israel, pages 6–7, 10–11, 21–23, 30–31, 49, 63–64, 68–69, 92, 96–98, 114, 162. New York: HarperSanFrancisco, 1990. .
Avram Israel Reisner. "Joint Aliyot." New York: Rabbinical Assembly, 1992. OH 136.1992. In Responsa: 1991–2000: The Committee on Jewish Law and Standards of the Conservative Movement. Edited by Kassel Abelson and David J. Fine, pages 21, 23–24. New York: Rabbinical Assembly, 2002. . (implications of the command to "exalt our God" for joint or single blessings).
A Song of Power and the Power of Song: Essays on the Book of Deuteronomy. Edited by Duane L. Christensen. Winona Lake, Indiana: Eisenbrauns, 1993. .
Steven Weitzman. "Lessons from the Dying: The Role of Deuteronomy 32 in Its Narrative Setting." Harvard Theological Review, volume 87 (number 4) (October 1994): page 377–93.
Judith S. Antonelli. "God's Daughters." In In the Image of God: A Feminist Commentary on the Torah, pages 494–95. Northvale, New Jersey: Jason Aronson, 1995. .
Richard Elliott Friedman. The Disappearance of God: A Divine Mystery. Boston: Little, Brown and Company, 1995. .
Ellen Frankel. The Five Books of Miriam: A Woman's Commentary on the Torah, pages 298–300. New York: G. P. Putnam's Sons, 1996. .
J. Clinton McCann Jr. "The Book of Psalms." In The New Interpreter's Bible. Edited by Leander E. Keck, volume 4, pages 743–50. Nashville: Abingdon Press, 1996. .
Solomon A. Nigosian. "The Song of Moses (DT 32): A Structural Analysis," Ephemerides Theologicae Lovanienses, volume 72 (1996): pages 5–22.
W. Gunther Plaut. The Haftarah Commentary, pages 518–30. New York: UAHC Press, 1996. .
Paul Sanders. The Provenance of Deuteronomy 32. Leiden: Brill Academic Pub, 1996. .
Jeffrey H. Tigay. The JPS Torah Commentary: Deuteronomy: The Traditional Hebrew Text with the New JPS Translation, pages 298–317, 508–18. Philadelphia: Jewish Publication Society, 1996. .
Sorel Goldberg Loeb and Barbara Binder Kadden. Teaching Torah: A Treasury of Insights and Activities, pages 345–49. Denver: A.R.E. Publishing, 1997. .
Solomon A. Nigosian. "Linguistic Patterns of Deuteronomy 32." Biblica, volume 78 (1997): pages 206–24.
Jan P. Fokkelman. Major Poems of the Hebrew Bible: At the Interface of Hermeneutics and Structural Analysis: Volume 1, Exodus 15, Deuteronomy 32, and Job 3, pages 58–62. Brill Academic Pub, 1998. .
Nina Beth Cardin. "Understanding the Anger." In The Women's Torah Commentary: New Insights from Women Rabbis on the 54 Weekly Torah Portions. Edited by Elyse Goldstein, pages 390–96. Woodstock, Vermont: Jewish Lights Publishing, 2000. .
Richard D. Nelson. "Deuteronomy." In The HarperCollins Bible Commentary. Edited by James L. Mays, pages 211–12. New York: HarperCollins Publishers, revised edition, 2000. .
Lainie Blum Cogan and Judy Weiss. Teaching Haftarah: Background, Insights, and Strategies, pages 91–99. Denver: A.R.E. Publishing, 2002. .
Michael Fishbane. The JPS Bible Commentary: Haftarot, pages 317–24, 384–91. Philadelphia: Jewish Publication Society, 2002. .
Ronald Bergey. "The Song of Moses (Deuteronomy 32.1–43) and Isaianic Prophecies: A Case of Early Intertextuality?" Journal for the Study of the Old Testament, volume 28 (number 1) (2003): pages 34–36.
Robert Alter. The Five Books of Moses: A Translation with Commentary, pages 1038–47. New York: W.W. Norton & Co., 2004. .
Bernard M. Levinson. "Deuteronomy." In The Jewish Study Bible. Edited by Adele Berlin and Marc Zvi Brettler, pages 440–45. New York: Oxford University Press, 2004. .
Matthew Thiessen. "The Form and Function of the Song of Moses (Deuteronomy 32:1–43)." Journal of Biblical Literature, volume 123 (number 3) (2004): pages 407–24.
Professors on the Parashah: Studies on the Weekly Torah Reading Edited by Leib Moscovitz, pages 349–54. Jerusalem: Urim Publications, 2005. .

W. Gunther Plaut. The Torah: A Modern Commentary: Revised Edition. Revised edition edited by David E.S. Stern, pages 1398–417. New York: Union for Reform Judaism, 2006. .
Suzanne A. Brody. "Witness." In Dancing in the White Spaces: The Yearly Torah Cycle and More Poems, page 111. Shelbyville, Kentucky: Wasteland Press, 2007. .
Jan Joosten. "A Note on the Text of Deuteronomy xxxii 8." Vetus Testamentum, volume 57 (number 4) (2007): pages 548–55.
Esther Jungreis. Life Is a Test, page 266. Brooklyn: Shaar Press, 2007. .

James L. Kugel. How To Read the Bible: A Guide to Scripture, Then and Now, pages 70, 308, 348, 355–56, 421, 621–22, 631–32. New York: Free Press, 2007. .
Mark Leuchter. "Why Is the Song of Moses in the Book of Deuteronomy? Vetus Testamentum, volume 57 (number 3) (2007): pages 295–317.
The Torah: A Women's Commentary. Edited by Tamara Cohn Eskenazi and Andrea L. Weiss, pages 1251–70. New York: URJ Press, 2008. .
Sidnie White Crawford, Jan Joosten, and Eugene Ulrich. "Sample Editions of the Oxford Hebrew Bible: Deuteronomy 32:1–9, 1 Kings 11:1–8, and Jeremiah 27:1–10 (34 G)." Vetus Testamentum, volume 58 (number 3) (2008): pages 352–66.
Eugene E. Carpenter. "Deuteronomy." In Zondervan Illustrated Bible Backgrounds Commentary. Edited by John H. Walton, volume 1, pages 516–20. Grand Rapids, Michigan: Zondervan, 2009. .
Terry Giles and William J. Doan. Twice-Used Songs: Performance Criticism of the Songs of Ancient Israel, pages 105–11. Peabody, Massachusetts: Hendrickson, 2009. .
Reuven Hammer. Entering Torah: Prefaces to the Weekly Torah Portion, pages 299–303. New York: Gefen Publishing House, 2009. .
Jhos Singer. "Dor l'Dor: Parashat Ha'azinu (Deuteronomy 32:1–52)." In Torah Queeries: Weekly Commentaries on the Hebrew Bible. Edited by Gregg Drinkwater, Joshua Lesser, and David Shneer; foreword by Judith Plaskow, pages 271–76. New York: New York University Press, 2009. .
Justin J. Evans. "I Love You: Text-Critical Note on Psalm 18:2." Vetus Testamentum, volume 60 (number 4) (2010): pages 659–61. ( is nearly identical to the haftarah).
James S. A. Corey. Leviathon Wakes, chapter 44. Orbit, 2011. . ("He knew the story of Moses seeing a promised land he would never enter. Miller wondered how the old prophet would've felt if he'd been ushered in for moment, a day, a week, a year, and then dropped back out into the desert. Kinder never to leave the wastelands. Safer.")

The Jewish Annotated New Testament. Edited by Amy-Jill Levine and Marc Zvi Brettler, page 2. New York: Oxford University Press, 2011. .
Shmuel Herzfeld. "Write for Yourselves This Song." In Fifty-Four Pick Up: Fifteen-Minute Inspirational Torah Lessons, pages 298–303. Jerusalem: Gefen Publishing House, 2012. .

Shlomo Riskin. Torah Lights: Devarim: Moses Bequeaths Legacy, History, and Covenant, pages 363–67. New Milford, Connecticut: Maggid Books, 2014. .
The Commentators' Bible: The Rubin JPS Miqra'ot Gedolot: Deuteronomy. Edited, translated, and annotated by Michael Carasik, pages 215–38. Philadelphia: Jewish Publication Society, 2015. .

Jonathan Sacks. Lessons in Leadership: A Weekly Reading of the Jewish Bible, pages 293–97. New Milford, Connecticut: Maggid Books, 2015. .
Jonathan Sacks. Essays on Ethics: A Weekly Reading of the Jewish Bible, pages 329–33. New Milford, Connecticut: Maggid Books, 2016. .
Shai Held. The Heart of Torah, Volume 2: Essays on the Weekly Torah Portion: Leviticus, Numbers, and Deuteronomy, pages 285–94. Philadelphia: Jewish Publication Society, 2017. .
Steven Levy and Sarah Levy. The JPS Rashi Discussion Torah Commentary, pages 177–80. Philadelphia: Jewish Publication Society, 2017. .
Ernst Wendland. Deuteronomy: translationNotes. Orlando, Florida: unfoldingWord, 2017.
Jonathan Sacks. Covenant & Conversation: A Weekly Reading of the Jewish Bible: Deuteronomy: Renewal of the Sinai Covenant, pages 309–43. New Milford, Connecticut: Maggid Books, 2019.

External links

Texts
Masoretic text and 1917 JPS translation
Hear the parashah chanted 
Hear the parashah read in Hebrew

Commentaries

Academy for Jewish Religion, New York
Aish.com 
Akhlah: The Jewish Children's Learning Network
Aleph Beta Academy
American Jewish University — Ziegler School of Rabbinic Studies
Anshe Emes Synagogue, Los Angeles 
Ari Goldwag
Ascent of Safed
Bar-Ilan University
Chabad.org
eparsha.com
G-dcast
The Israel Koschitzky Virtual Beit Midrash
Jewish Agency for Israel
Jewish Theological Seminary
Kabbala Online
Mechon Hadar
MyJewishLearning.com
Ohr Sameach
ON Scripture — The Torah
Orthodox Union
OzTorah, Torah from Australia
Oz Ve Shalom — Netivot Shalom
Pardes from Jerusalem
Professor James L. Kugel
Professor Michael Carasik
Rabbi Fabian Werbin
Rabbi Jonathan Sacks
RabbiShimon.com 
Rabbi Shlomo Riskin
Rabbi Shmuel Herzfeld
Rabbi Stan Levin
Reconstructionist Judaism 
Sephardic Institute
Shiur.com
613.org Jewish Torah Audio
Tanach Study Center
TheTorah.com 
Torah from Dixie 
Torah.org
TorahVort.com
Union for Reform Judaism
United Synagogue of Conservative Judaism 
What's Bothering Rashi?
Yeshivat Chovevei Torah
Yeshiva University

Weekly Torah readings in Tishrei
Weekly Torah readings from Deuteronomy